A creek in North America and elsewhere, such as Australia, is a stream that is usually smaller than a river. In the British Isles it is a small tidal inlet.

Creek may also refer to:

People
 Creek people, also known as Muscogee, Native Americans
 Amber Creek (1982–1997), American murder victim
 Mitch Creek (born 1992), Australian basketball player

Other uses
 Creek or Muscogee language
 Creek County, Oklahoma, United States
 Creek Audio, a British hi-fi company
 TH-67 Creek, a U.S. Army variant of the Bell 206 helicopter
 The title character of Jonathan Creek, BBC TV mystery series

See also
 Creak (disambiguation)
 Crick (disambiguation)
 Kreek, a surname

Language and nationality disambiguation pages